Bitovik (Serbian Cyrillic: Битовик) is a mountain in southwestern Serbia, above the village of  Bistrica.

References

Mountains of Serbia